General elections were held in the Netherlands on 25 May 1977. The Labour Party remained the largest party, winning 53 of the 150 seats in the House of Representatives. Following the election, it took 208 days of negotiations to form a new government. This was a European record for longest government formation that stood until after the 2010 Belgian general election. The Christian Democratic Appeal was formed by the Anti-Revolutionary Party (ARP), Christian Historical Union (CHU) and the Catholic People's Party (KVP) in 1976. The first joint party leader was a member of the KVP, Dries van Agt.

Eventually a coalition was formed between the Christian Democratic Appeal and the People's Party for Freedom and Democracy with Dries van Agt as Prime Minister.

Results

By province

References

1977
1977 elections in the Netherlands
May 1977 events in Europe